Qeshlaq-e Sofla (also Romanized as Qeshlāq-e Soflá; also known as Qeshlāq-e Khosrow Khān and Qeshlāq-e Khosrow Khānī) is a village in Shur Dasht Rural District, Shara District, Hamadan County, Hamadan Province, Iran. At the 2006 census, its population was 97, in 25 families.

References 

Populated places in Hamadan County